Science fiction and fantasy in the Czech Republic has a long and varied history.  From 1918, when Czechoslovakia became independent, until 1939, when Nazi Germany invaded it, Czech literature enjoyed one of its high points.

Czech writers developed their works as aesthetic pieces rather than as platforms demanding independence for the Czech people.  The best-known and most important of SF writers was Karel Čapek, whose play R.U.R. (Rossum's Universal Robots) (printed 1920, premiered January 1921), introduced and made popular the frequently used international word robot.

Čapek is perhaps best known as a science fiction author, who wrote before science fiction became established as a separate genre. He can be considered one of the founders of classical, non-hardcore European science fiction, a type which focuses on possible future (or alternative) social and human evolution on Earth, rather than technically advanced stories of space travel. However, it is best to classify him with Aldous Huxley and George Orwell as a mainstream literary figure who used science-fiction motifs.  Many of his works discuss ethical and other aspects of revolutionary inventions and processes that were already anticipated in the first half of 20th century. These include mass production, atomic weapons, and non-human intelligent beings such as robots, space-faring gypsies or intelligent salamanders (in his War with the Newts).

Josef Nesvadba, writing since the late 1950s, quickly became the best-known Czech SF authors of the post-war generation, being translated into English and German, even though he moved from the SF proper after his first 3 story collections to the fringes of fantastic genre and mainstream.

The modern era of Czech SF began in late 1970s, coinciding and soon interacting with the founding of science fiction fandom in 1979.

Notable Czech SF writers
Karel Čapek
Josef Nesvadba
Ludvík Souček
Ondřej Neff
Jiří Kulhánek
Miroslav Žamboch
Jaroslav Velinský
Lucie Lukačovičová
Petra Neomillnerová

Film
 Skeleton on Horseback (Bílá nemoc) (1937)
 Krakatit (1948)
 Journey to the Beginning of Time (1955)
 The Fabulous World of Jules Verne (1958)
 Man in Outer Space (1961)
 The Cybernetic Grandma (1962)
 Voyage to the End of the Universe (Ikarie XB-1, 1963)
 Who Wants to Kill Jessie? (1966)
 Late August at the Hotel Ozone (1967)
 I Killed Einstein, Gentlemen (1969)
 On the Comet (1970)
 You Are a Widow, Sir (1971)
 Což takhle dát si špenát (1977)
 Tomorrow I'll Wake Up and Scald Myself with Tea (1977)
 Talíře nad Velkým Malíkovem (1977)
 Visitors from the Galaxy (1981)
 The Mysterious Castle in the Carpathians (1981)
 Srdečný pozdrav ze zeměkoule (1983)
 Wolf's Hole (1987)
 The Witches Cave (1989)
 A Sound of Thunder (2005)
 Snowpiercer (2013)
 Lajka (2017)

Notes

References
 Ivan Adamovič, Jaroslav Olša, Jr.: Czech and Slovak SF, in The Encyclopedia of Science Fiction (2nd ed 1993)
 Adamovič, Ivan (ed). Encyklopedie fantastického filmu. Praha: Cinema, 1994. 224 pp.  (Encyclopedia of fantastic film, with résumé in English)
 “SF in the Czech Republic,” Locus, 31 (6): 38. December 1993.
 Science Fiction, a Global Community: Czech Republic, Locus, 32 (4): 42.  April 1994.
 Adamovič, Ivan. SF in the Czech Republic, Locus, 33 (1): 45-46. July 1994.
 Adamovič, Ivan. SF in the Czech Republic, Locus, 34 (4): 38-9.  April 1995.
 Hauser(ová), Eva. “Science Fiction in the Czech Republic and the Former Czechoslovakia: The Pleasures and the Disappointments of the New Cosmopolitanism”, Science Fiction Studies #63, Vol 21 (Issue 2): 133-140. July 1994.
 Overview of late 1990s Czech science fiction in a Usenet post
 Robots and Vigilante Vampires: Radio Prague brief interview on the current state of the genre, 22 June 2008

Czech science fiction